Seamlessly loopable is a term generally used for recordings or images that can be combined an infinite number of times without a noticeable joining seam. When used in music, animation, and video it generally refers to media that can be laid on a timeline, multiple times, back-to-back with no visible jump or jump cut as it cycles between the clips.

The term when used in still images means that an image when laid left to right or top to bottom will join with itself with little or no visible seam.

Cinematic techniques

References